Ras-related protein Rab-5A is a protein that in humans is encoded by the RAB5A gene.

Function 

RAB5A localizes to early endosomes where it is involved in the recruitment of RAB7A and the maturation of these compartments to late endosomes. It drives the maturation of endosomes by transporting vacuolar (H+)-ATPases (V-ATPases) from trans-Golgi network to endocytic vesicles.

Interactions 

RAB5A has been shown to interact with:

 CHML,
 RABEP1, 
 SDCBP,  and
 ZFYVE20

References

Further reading